Antonio Fioribello (died 1574) was a Roman Catholic prelate who served as Bishop of Lavello (1558–1561).

Biography
On 24 August 1558, Antonio Fioribello was appointed by Pope Paul IV as Bishop of Lavello.
He served as Bishop of Lavello until his resignation in 1561. He died in 1574. 
While bishop, he was the principal co-consecrator of Paolo Oberti, Bishop of Venosa.

References

External links and additional sources
 (Chronology of Bishops) 
 (Chronology of Bishops) 

16th-century Italian Roman Catholic bishops
1574 deaths
Bishops appointed by Pope Paul IV